Orestis Makris (30 September 1898 – 29 January 1975) was a Greek actor and tenor.

Biography
Makris graduated from the Athens Conservatoire and first entered the scene as a tenor in the troupe of Rosalia Nika in 1925. He later joined the Papaioannou troupe, before moving to more comedic roles. Makris excelled in the portrayal of folk characters, especially the stock role of the "drunkard". Makris also participated in about forty movies, mostly as an over-strict father. He is considered one of the most significant modern Greek actors.

He was decorated with the Order of the Phoenix. He died on 29 January 1975 in Athens and is buried at the First Cemetery in a family grave.

Filmography

On stage

External links

1898 births
1975 deaths
People from Chalcis
20th-century Greek male actors
Greek male stage actors
Greek male film actors
Greek tenors
Greek comedians
Recipients of the Order of the Phoenix (Greece)
Burials at the First Cemetery of Athens
20th-century Greek male singers
20th-century comedians
Greek male silent film actors